The Lanfier Colony is a 1969 Czech-Soviet action, romantic, drama film directed by Jan Schmidt. It was entered into the 6th Moscow International Film Festival.

Plot
Tired of life on the continent, Horn convinces the captain of a Dutch sailing ship to land it on the shore of distant island.

Residents of the small village greet the newly arrived colonist with a barely concealed distaste, but he is in no hurry to make new friends and makes his home far away from people.

Horn is dreaming about solitude, because in his previous life behind him he left only disappointment; unrequited love, and failed attempts to make money on the tea trade.

Of all the inhabitants of the islands Horn befriends only two, poor lonely wretches just like him; feeble-minded Bekeko and beautiful Esther who is forced to prepare for a wedding with a man she does not love.

Horn finds a gold deposit located near a river. Now he wants only one thing – to collect as much precious metal as possible, return to the mainland and try to start over. Horn separates itself from Bekeko and refuses Esther's offer to live together.

Horn's discourse with the younger Dribb, Esther's fiancé is followed by a quarrel and exchanged gunshots. Wounded Dribb rides out for help, and soon Horn is forced to face the well-armed squad of people who hate him.

Cast
 Juozas Budraitis as Horn
 Zuzana Kocúriková as Ester
 Václav Neckář as Fool Bekeko
 Michal Dočolomanský as Young Dribb
 Josef Elsner as Old Dribb
 Bolot Beyshenaliyev as Goupi - swineherd
 Beta Ponicanova as Saba
 Bohumil Vávra as Astis - Ester's father
 Andrei Fajt as Lanfieri

References

External links
 

1969 films
1969 drama films
Czech action adventure films
Czech romantic drama films
1960s Czech-language films
Soviet action adventure films
Soviet romantic drama films
Soviet multilingual films
Czechoslovak multilingual films
1960s Russian-language films
Czech black-and-white films
Czechoslovak black-and-white films
Soviet black-and-white films
Russian romantic drama films
1960s action adventure films
Russian black-and-white films
1960s multilingual films
1960s Czech films
Czech romantic action films